Abyss is the fourth studio album by American singer-songwriter and her eponymous band Chelsea Wolfe. The album was released on August 7, 2015 through Sargent House and was produced by John Congleton. It also features guest contributions from Mike Sullivan of Russian Circles and Dan Phillips from True Widow.

The album received positive reviews from music critics and peaked at No. 130 on the Billboard 200, becoming Wolfe's first album to enter the chart.

Musical style
Nina Corcoran of Consequence of Sound described the album as "strik[ing] a fine balance between gothic folk and electronic noise rock" and "embracing metal and overpowering drones". Brandon Stosuy of Pitchfork noted that metallic elements are "built into, and integral to, the music, which frequently booms with distorted doom-metal guitar." Tristan Jones of Sputnikmusic wrote: "Though “darkwave” is a fitting descriptor, elements of doom, folk, noise, and industrial seep in."  Giuseppe Zevolli of Drowned in Sound associated the album with goth rock, writing that it "could appeal to fans of metal, folk, industrial and alternative rock in equal measure".

Release
Abyss was initially announced through Chelsea Wolfe's website on January 8, 2015 with the news that it would be released via Sargent House. This was followed up by a more detailed announcement on April 22, 2015 with news of the album's collaborators - Ben Chisholm, Dylan Fujioka, Ezra Buchla, special guests Mike Sullivan (Russian Circles), Dan Phillips (True Widow) and the announcement of John Congleton as the album's producer. A trailer was also released to accompany the album's announcement.

Details of the album's tracklisting, as well as its cover art were revealed by Rolling Stone on April 28. These details also coincided with the release of a clip from the track 'Iron Moon' and a statement from Wolfe regarding the song: "The music is co-written by our friend Karlos Ayala who wrote the song 'Boyfriend' we covered a few years back. Lyrically, this song was inspired after reading the poetry of a Foxconn worker who took his own life – his frustration and desperation. There's a blurry confusion throughout the lyrics on the album, as it sometimes is in dreams, like you're new to the afterlife and things are slightly different, more hazy and fluid. I imagine the quiet parts of the song sung from a small, dorm-style room, and the loud parts as a scene out of a musical, where the worker sings and dances through the factory lines with total freedom and abandon. Such a great crew of musicians came together to bring these feelings and sounds to life." Wolfe also discussed the album itself, describing it as "the feeling of when you're dreaming, and you briefly wake up, but then fall back asleep into the same dream, diving quickly into your own subconscious."

On June 2, a second song from the album - 'Carrion Flowers' was debuted through NPR. Writer Lars Gotrich described the track as "dark and bottomless as a river at night" and  "beautiful and terrifying."

Dates for the album's North American tour with alternative country band Wovenhand were announced on Wolfe's official website two days later. Additional dates for the European tour were announced on July 30. The news coincided with a link to an exclusive stream of the full album on NPR's website.

The final track from the album to be unveiled before its release was After the Fall. The song was posted by Noisey on July 8. In a statement to coincide with the track's release, writer John Hill claimed that it displayed "both the delicate and world burning sides of Wolfe. The music itself feels otherworldly in its production, going to lengths to make everything nearly blissful. When the chorus kicks in, everything goes crashing into the earth at a million miles an hour, the distortion of the synth becoming more and more massive with each second. The electronic crunch is the kind of noise you'd probably hear at the last concert before the apocalypse. Her voice effortlessly goes back and forth between these two modes, reminding us why she's the best."

Reception

Upon its release Abyss generally received positive reviews from contemporary music critics. At Metacritic, which assigns a normalized rating out of 100 to reviews from mainstream critics, the album received an average score of 79, based on 24 reviews, which indicates "generally favorable reviews".

In her review for AllMusic, Heather Phares declared that "On Abyss, Chelsea Wolfe brings the heaviness in her music to the fore in a way that's more natural, and more compelling, than merely "going metal." Given the darkness and drama present even on her unplugged album Unknown Rooms—as well as tours and collaborations with artists such as Russian Circles—it was inevitable that she'd embrace her metal leanings more fully, but Abyss exceeds expectations." Nina Corocran of Consequence of Sound wrote that "There’s a vast landscape in Abyss, but most times it’s too dark to be certain of what you see. That wavering imagery, an intentional creative choice, gives the album room to swell with personalized monsters." Drowned in Sound critic Giuseppe Zevolli wrote: "Abyss proves that there's still much work to do in the dark side of alt rock. Chelsea Wolfe is surely ahead of the curve."

Reviewing the album for Pitchfork, contributor Brandon Stosuy declared "Wolfe has incorporated metallic elements into her music since the beginning—especially on 2013's Pain Is Beauty—but she's never really gone full-on metal. And, honestly, she still hasn't, but on Abyss she comes closer than ever, externalizing those tendencies. She's thrown in moments of distortion, animal-like growling, or hiss on her other records, but it could come off like an affectation or add-on; here, it's built into, and integral to, the music, which frequently booms with distorted doom-metal guitar."

Track listing

Personnel
Abyss album personnel adapted from AllMusic.

Chelsea Wolfe – bass, guitar, piano, vocals
Ezra Buchla – viola, vocals
Ben Chisholm – bass, guitar, keyboards, layout, photography, piano, programming
John Congleton – engineer, producer
Dylan Fujioka – drums
D.H. Phillips – lap steel guitar
Mike Sullivan – guitar
Henrik Uldalen – cover art, paintings

Charts

References

2015 albums
Chelsea Wolfe albums
Sargent House albums
Albums produced by John Congleton